Korobovo is a rural locality (a village) in Sosnovskoye Rural Settlement, Vologodsky District, Vologda Oblast, Russia. The population was 158 as of 2002. There are 4 streets.

Geography 
Korobovo is located 61 km northwest of Vologda (the district's administrative centre) by road. Andryushino is the nearest rural locality.

References 

Rural localities in Vologodsky District